The Trail of the Tiger is a 1927 American film serial directed by Henry MacRae. The film is considered to be lost.

Cast
 Jack Dougherty as Jack Stewart (as Jack Daugherty)
 Frances Teague as Trixie Hemingway
 Jack Mower as Tiger Jordan
 John Webb Dillion as John Hemingway
 Charles Murphy as Rube Murphy
 Billy Platt as Babs, the Dwarf (as William Platt)
 Jack Richardson as Ned Calvert

See also
 List of film serials
 List of film serials by studio

References

External links

1927 films
1927 lost films
1920s thriller films
American silent serial films
American black-and-white films
American thriller films
Universal Pictures film serials
Films directed by Henry MacRae
Lost American films
Silent thriller films
1920s American films